Lessertia is a genus of flowering plants in the legume family, Fabaceae. The genus contains some 55 species and belongs to the subfamily Faboideae.

Species list
Selected species include:

 Lessertia affinis
 Lessertia annularis
 Lessertia benguellensis
 Lessertia brachypus
 Lessertia brachystachya
 Lessertia capitata
 Lessertia depressa
 Lessertia diffusa
 Lessertia emarginata
 Lessertia excisa
 Lessertia falciformis
 Lessertia frutescens
 Lessertia harveyana
 Lessertia herbacea
 Lessertia incana
 Lessertia inflata
 Lessertia macrostachya
 Lessertia microphylla
 Lessertia pauciflora
 Lessertia perennans
 Lessertia rigida
 Lessertia spinescens
 Lessertia stenoloba
 Lessertia stricta
 Lessertia thodei

References

Galegeae
Fabaceae genera